Pasay City South High School is a large public school in Pasay, Philippines, established in 1967.  It is located at Piccio Garden, Villamor Air Base.

History 
Pasay City South High School started as an Annex of Pasay City West High School formerly known as Pasay City High School located in FB Harrison, Pasay in 1967 with only two sections in the first year.

In 1968, five pre-fabricated Marcos type buildings were constructed between Andrews Avenue and Manlunas St. The PAF provided the buildings while the Pasay Government provided the salaries of teachers.

In 1969, PCSHS became independent from her mother school. Mrs. Roque was the first principal of the school. During the incumbency, two fabricated school building was added, the Vocational and the Annex buildings. The school population increased every year. The number of classrooms became inadequate when the building fronting Manlunas St. was burned on February 26, 1978, due to faulty electrical wirings. It was replaced to Bagong Lipunan Building constructed by DPWH in 1978. As years passed by, more buildings were constructed with more convenient facilities.

Due to the transformation of Villamor Air Base into a prime residential and commercial enclave, the school was affected by the development of Newport City. BCDA in partnership with Megaworld Corporation replicated the structure of the school  to its present location at Picio Garden, Villamor Air Base, Pasay.

References

External links 
 Official website

High schools in Metro Manila
Schools in Pasay